Move Over, Darling is a 1963 American comedy film starring Doris Day, James Garner, and Polly Bergen and directed by Michael Gordon filmed in DeLuxe Color and CinemaScope released by 20th Century Fox.

The film is a remake of a 1940 screwball comedy film, My Favorite Wife, with Irene Dunne, Cary Grant and Gail Patrick. In between these movies, an unfinished version, entitled Something's Got to Give, began shooting in 1962, directed by George Cukor and starring Marilyn Monroe, Dean Martin and Cyd Charisse. The supporting cast of Move Over, Darling features Thelma Ritter, Fred Clark, Don Knotts, Chuck Connors, Edgar Buchanan, Pat Harrington, Jr. and John Astin. Only Ritter had played the same role in Something's Got to Give.

Move Over, Darling was chosen as the 1964 Royal Film Performance, and had its UK premiere on 24 February 1964 at the Odeon Leicester Square in the presence of H.R.H. Prince Philip, Duke of Edinburgh.

At the 21st Golden Globe Awards, Doris Day was nominated for Best Actress in a Comedy/Musical but lost to Shirley MacLaine in Irma la Douce.

Plot
Lawyer Nick Arden is in court to get two petitions approved: he wants his wife Ellen Wagstaff Arden declared legally dead after the plane they were traveling on went down in the Pacific Ocean five years ago and she went missing during the rescue. And he wants to marry Bianca Steele. After some confusion, the judge declares Ellen legally dead and marries Nick and Bianca, who then immediately leave for Monterey for their honeymoon.

On the same day, Ellen returns to shore on a U.S. Navy submarine, which had rescued her from a deserted island where she had spent the last five years. When she returns to her and Nick's home, she encounters her young daughters, who do not remember her, but she does not have the heart to tell them the truth. Her mother-in-law Grace Arden tells her of the new marriage and puts her on a plane to Monterey so that she can prevent its consummation.

Ellen arrives at the hotel and manages to alert Nick of her presence, who is overjoyed to reunite with her and wants to stay with her. Ellen requests that he tell Bianca the truth first. When Nick returns to a confused and angry Bianca, Ellen eavesdrops on their conversation. Nick cannot bring himself to tell Bianca the truth and Ellen leaves the hotel angrily. When Nick sees Ellen leave, he fakes an injury to prevent further advances by Bianca.

The next day, when Nick comes home, he is informed that Ellen was on the deserted island with a man called Stephen Burkett for the whole five years and that both called each other "Adam" and "Eve". Nick is furious that Ellen did not tell him about Burkett and confronts her. She tells him that Burkett is a nerd and that nothing happened between them. She even convinces an awkward-looking shoe clerk to pose as Burkett. Nick, not convinced, looks for Burkett himself. When he finds him at a hotel pool, he notices to his horror that Burkett is young, attractive, and athletic. Nick invites Ellen to the same pool bar to confront her with Burkett. But before she sees Burkett, she tells the truth about him but still swears that nothing happened between the two in the five years and asks for Nick's forgiveness. But when she notices Burkett, she angrily accuses Nick of trying to embarrass her and storms off.

Nick tells Bianca the truth about Ellen but is informed that Grace has reported him for bigamy earlier to force him to make a decision regarding Ellen and Bianca. This leads to another chaotic court date, where several matters are put to the decision of the same judge, who is even more confused: Nick's charge of bigamy, Bianca's request to annul their marriage, Ellen's request to void her death certificate, and Ellen's request for a divorce from Nick. The judge dismisses the bigamy charge, annuls Nick's and Bianca's marriage, declares Ellen alive again and postpones judgement on the divorce proceedings.

When Ellen returns to her home several hours later, devastated, Nick has already told his daughters that she is their mother and all happily reunite.

Cast
 Doris Day as Ellen Wagstaff Arden ("Eve")
 James Garner as Nick Arden
 Polly Bergen as Bianca Steele Arden
 Thelma Ritter as Grace Arden
 Fred Clark as Mr. Codd
 Don Knotts as Shoe Clerk
 Chuck Connors as Stephen Burkett ("Adam")
 Edgar Buchanan as Judge Bryson
 John Astin as Clyde Prokey
 Elliott Reid as Dr. Herman Schlick
 Pat Harrington Jr. as District Attorney
 Alan Sues as Court Clerk
 Max Showalter as Hotel Desk Clerk
 Eddie Quillan as Bellboy
 Jack Orrison as Bartender
 Pami Lee as Jenny Arden
 Leslie Farrell as Didi Arden

Production notes

The film's script was written by Hal Kanter and Jack Sher, reworking an earlier script written by Arnold Schulman, Nunnally Johnson and Walter Bernstein that was an update of 1940's My Favorite Wife by Leo McCarey and Samuel and Bella Spewack.  The script includes a reference to My Favorite Wife during the scene in which Ellen gives Bianca a massage.

The story is a comedic update of the 1864 poem "Enoch Arden" by Alfred, Lord Tennyson, and the poem's title is the source of the lead characters' surname. This was the seventh film based on "Enoch Arden".

The film was originally to be a vehicle for Marilyn Monroe under the working title of Something's Got to Give, with George Cukor as director. Dean Martin was cast as Nick Arden after initial choice James Garner was committed to doing The Great Escape. Monroe was fired early in the original production cycle following repeated absences on filming days, ultimately appearing in only about 30 minutes of usable film. At first, it was announced that Lee Remick would step into Monroe's place; though some press pictures were released and some scenes were shot with Remick, Martin balked at working with anyone but Monroe. Monroe was rehired but died before she could resume filming, leaving the original version incomplete. Unable to complete the film, and having already sunk a considerable amount of money into the production and sets, 20th Century Fox went ahead with the project, albeit with a new title, new director Michael Gordon, and a new cast (with the exception of Thelma Ritter, who was also cast as Grace Arden in the Cukor version). Garner, now available following the completion of his work in The Great Escape, was cast as Nick Arden.

Garner accidentally broke Day's rib during the massage scene in which he pulls Day off of Bergen. He was not aware of what had happened until the next day, when he felt the bandage while putting his arms around Day.

The film utilized most of the interiors and stage-built exteriors from the original Cukor production for the Arden home, which was based on Cukor's Beverly Hills home. The on-location exterior scenes at the Arden home were filmed about three miles west, at 377 South Mapleton Drive in Holmby Hills. The original neoclassical house seen in the film has since been replaced by an enormous Italianate structure.

The producers scheduled the scene with Day riding through a car wash for the last day of shooting because they feared that the chemicals in the detergents might affect her complexion. When the scene went off without a hitch, they admitted their ploy to Day, then used the story in promotional materials for the film.

Box office
The film grossed $12,705,882 in the United States, becoming one of the biggest hits of the year and helping keep 20th Century Fox afloat after the losses it had incurred in the making of Cleopatra. Move Over, Darling earned $6 million in U.S. theatrical rentals.

According to Fox records, the film was profitable, as it earned $8,750,000, exceeding the $8,300,000 needed in order to break even.

Reception
The film has received generally mixed reviews from critics. In 1963, a review in Variety stated: "Doris Day and James Garner play it to the hilt, comically, dramatically and last, but not least (particularly in the case of the former), athletically. What is missing in their portrayals is a light touch, the ability to humorously convey with a subtle eyelash-bat or eyebrow-arch what it tends to take them a kick in the shins to accomplish."

However, more recent reviews have been more positive. David Nusair of Reel Film Reviews praised James Garner’s performance and Sue Heal of Radio Times gave the film four out of five stars, stating: "Slick, utterly professional and without a wasted scene, this is a sheer delight from start to finish."

Soundtrack
 "Move Over Darling" – The film's title theme, with music and lyrics by Joe Lubin, Hal Kanter and Terry Melcher (Day's son), arranged by Jack Nitzsche, is sung by Day and chorus (featuring ace West Coast session singers the Blossoms, featuring Darlene Love, Fanita James and Jean King) during the opening credits and played as background music at the end. The song reached #8 on the British singles chart in 1964 for Day and charted in 1983 for Tracey Ullman.
 "Bridal Chorus (Here Comes the Bride)" from Lohengrin (1850) – Written by Richard Wagner, the song is played when Nick and Bianca arrive at their honeymoon hotel.
 "Beautiful Dreamer" – With music and lyrics by Stephen Foster, it is heard as background music during the memorial service for Ellen.
 "Twinkle Lullaby" – Ellen sings this song, with music and lyrics by Joe Lubin, to her children.

Novelization

Slightly in advance of the film's release, as was the custom of the era, a paperback novelization of the film was published by Dell Books. The author was renowned crime and western novelist Marvin H. Albert, who also made something of a cottage industry out of movie tie-ins. He seems to have been the most prolific screenplay novelizer of the late 1950s through the mid-1960s, and, during that time, the preeminent specialist at light comedy. The book can be classified as an "inferred novelization" as none of the screenwriters is given attribution, but the copyright is assigned to Twentieth Century Fox. The cover displays a painting of Garner carrying Day in his arms against an all-white background, a typical Dell cover to a romantic comedy tie-in. The book also contains a four-page insert of black-and-white movie stills. The cover price is 40¢.

See also
 List of American films of 1963

References

External links
 
 

1963 films
1963 comedy films
1963 romantic comedy films
1960s English-language films
1960s screwball comedy films
20th Century Fox films
CinemaScope films
Remakes of American films
American romantic comedy films
American screwball comedy films
Comedy of remarriage films
Films about polygamy
Films based on Enoch Arden
Films based on works by Alfred, Lord Tennyson
Films directed by Michael Gordon
Films scored by Lionel Newman
Films with screenplays by Jack Sher
1960s American films